This is a list of the National Register of Historic Places listings in Collin County, Texas.

This is intended to be a complete list of properties and districts listed on the National Register of Historic Places in Collin County, Texas. There are seven districts, 62 individual properties, and one former property listed on the National Register in the county. Sixteen individually listed properties are Recorded Texas Historic Landmarks while four districts contain many more including one that is also a State Antiquities Landmark.

Current listings

The publicly disclosed locations of National Register properties and districts may be seen in a mapping service provided.

|}

Former listing

|}

See also

National Register of Historic Places listings in Texas
Recorded Texas Historic Landmarks in Collin County

References

External links

Registered Historic Places
Collin County
Buildings and structures in Collin County, Texas